Meet the Moonlight is the eighth studio album by American musician Jack Johnson. The album was released on June 24, 2022, and marks Johnson's first release in five years. Johnson worked with producer Blake Mills on the album, and released the lead single "One Step Ahead" on April 8, 2022.

Production 
Johnson worked on this album with producer Blake Mills who had previously worked with Alabama Shakes and Fiona Apple. In an article with Rolling Stone, Johnson was asked how he connected with Mills, he stated, "When Blake and I first got in touch we'd send each other playlists, and over time we realized we were drawn to music that sounds effortless despite all the effort put into making it. After a while we got a language together and I gained a trust in him that allowed me to let go, push outside my comfort zone, and get to a sound I really loved."

Recording 
The album was recorded at The Mango Tree, Jack's home studio, and at EastWest Studios and Sound City Studios in Los Angeles. In an interview with Kyle Meredith from Consequence of Sound, Johnson stated that most of the album was recorded by Johnson and Mills themselves, and his band of Zach Gill, Merlo Podleweski and Adam Topol added finishing touches. Johnson praised Mills for his guitar playing, and stated that he is one of the greatest guitar players of all time in an interview with Zane Lowe.

Commercial performance 
The album performed poorly in many nations compared to previous Jack Johnson releases. The album debuted on the Billboard 200 at number 47 with 13,787 units sold, 10,292 being pure album sales. It is his first studio album not to reach the top 10 since 2001's Brushfire Fairytales. The album also reached number 70 in Australia, ending his streak of 7 straight top 5 albums.

Tour 
On June 21st, 2022, Jack Johnson embarked on a 35-stop tour of the United States to promote the album, entitled the Meet the Moonlight Tour. The tour began at the Bank of New Hampshire Pavilion in Gilford, New Hampshire and visited major cities across the United States (including Hawaii) and Canada. On the tour, Jack Johnson was joined on various dates by artists such as Grammy-award winner Ziggy Marley, Ben Harper, and Durand Jones & The Indications. In November, Jack Johnson will tour the album in Australia and New Zealand, and will be accompanied by Ziggy Alberts, Emily Wurramara, and The Black Seeds.

Track listing

Personnel 
 Jack Johnson – vocals, bass, bottles, drums, guitar, percussion, slide guitar, ukulele
 Blake Mills – production, mixing, bass, drums, guitar, organ, percussion, slide guitar (all tracks); background vocals (1)
 Joseph Lorge – mixing, engineering
 Patricia Sullivan – mastering
 Zach Gill – melodica (1), piano (5–7), background vocals (6), organ (7)
 Merlo Podlewski – vibraphone (1), percussion (3)
 Adam Topol – drums (4), percussion (4, 6)

Charts

References 

2022 albums
Jack Johnson (musician) albums